Quarré may refer to:

 Quarré-les-Tombes, a commune in the Bourgogne-Franche-Comté region of north-central France
 Jean Quarré (1919–1942), French printer and communist activist